Wood is an unincorporated community in Clayton County, Iowa, United States. The county seat of Elkader lies 14 miles to the north.

History
Wood's population was 50 in 1925.

References

Unincorporated communities in Clayton County, Iowa
Unincorporated communities in Iowa